Statistics of National Association Foot Ball League in season 1914-15.

League standings
                          GP   W   L   T   Pts
 West Hudson A.A.          16  14   2   0   28
 Jersey A.C.               16  13   2   1   27
 Kearny Scots              16   8   3   5   21
 Bronx United              14   7   7   0   14
 New York Clan MacDonald   14   5   5   4   14
 Brooklyn F.C.             14   5   6   3   13
 Paterson Rangers          14   4   6   4   12
 Newark F.C.               16   2  13   1    5
 Paterson True Blues       16   0  14   2    2

References
NATIONAL ASSOCIATION FOOT BALL LEAGUE (RSSSF)

1914-15
1914–15 domestic association football leagues
1914–15 in American soccer